Anders Hjorth Hald (3 July 1913 – 11 November 2007) was a Danish statistician. He was a professor at the University of Copenhagen from 1960 to 1982. While a professor, he did research in industrial quality control and other areas, and also authored textbooks. After retirement, he made important contributions to the history of statistics.

Hald was a Fellow of the American Statistical Association, a Member of the Royal Danish Academy of Science and Letters, a Member of the Institute of Mathematical Statistics, an Honorary Fellow of the Royal Statistical Society, and a Corresponding Fellow of the Royal Society of Edinburgh.

Bibliography 

 "T. N. Thiele's contributions to statistics", International Statistical Review, 49, number 1 (1981): 1–20. (Reprinted in )
 "The early history of the cumulants and the Gram–Charlier series", International Statistical Review, 68, number 2 (2000): 137–153. (Reprinted in )

In Danish 
 Statistiske Metoder, 1949
 Statistisk Kvalitetskontrol, 1954
 Statistiske Metoder i Arbejdsstudierteknikken, 1955
 Elementær Lærebog i Statistisk Kvalitetskontrol, 1956

References 

 Kraks Blå Bog 1984
 There is an obituary by Neils Keiding at IMS Bulletin 37, issue 1 (2008), p. 12.
 The Royal Society of Edinburgh has an obituary, written by David Finney, at ANDERS H. HALD

External links
 There is a photograph at Anders Hald on the Portraits of Statisticians page.
There is a bibliography of Hald's writings on the history of statistics at Anders Hald (1913–2007): Writings on the History of Probability and Statistics in the Electronic Journal for History of Probability and Statistics.

1913 births
2007 deaths
Danish mathematicians
20th-century American mathematicians
Danish statisticians
20th-century Danish historians
Danish historians of mathematics
Fellows of the American Statistical Association